Deadly Gamble is a 2015 independent horror film written and directed by Mario Cerrito III. The movie was released on US cable channels in March 2015.

Plot

The film follows the downward spiral of degenerate gambler Andrew Cain in the gambling underworld. The main character gets so far deep in debt with the Russian mafia that he risks the lives of his family to fuel his addiction. He convinces his mother he needs money for a business endeavor and uses it in a high stakes poker game to try and win money  to pay the Russians back.

Cast
 Bernard Glincosky as "Andrew Cain"
 Lyssa Roberts as "Heather Cain"
 Manny Mertis as "Viktor"
 Michelle Pauls as "Sue"
 John DiRenzo as "Frank"

Production

The film was written, produced and directed by Mario Cerrito III. The movie was made on a $10,000 budget.  Filming started in November 2013 in New Jersey and production spanned a month and was in post production until June 2014.

Release
Deadly Gamble was signed to Los Angeles distributor Cinema Epoch. In March 2015 it was released nationwide to cable on demand platforms Comcast Xfinity, Verizon FiOS, Dish Network and Cox Cable. It was later released to various streaming platforms such as Walmart's VUDU, and Walmart.com. It was also released to EPIX and Fandango Media.

Reception
The movie was ranked #3 in the top ten for independent horror films by Tom H Blog of Horror for 2015 and was also ranked in the top 40 for horror films by popular horror website and critics Hell Horror.

References

External links

2015 horror films
2015 independent films
American horror films
American independent films
2010s English-language films
2010s American films